On 16 December 2016, a bombing plot was uncovered in Ludwigshafen, Germany. The 12-year-old German-Iraqi boy, who was reported to be the perpetrator, was directed by an ISIL supporter to build two nail bombs and plant them at the local Christmas market and near a shopping centre.

Incidents
After a first attempt failed at the Christmas market on 26 November when the bomb did not explode, the boy tried a second time on 5 December near the mall and the town hall of Ludwigshafen. He was reported to have been radicalised or instructed by an unidentified ISIS member. The German federal prosecutor declined to comment on the ISIS stories and announced an investigation into his motives. The device contained “pyrotechnic material” believed to have been extracted from fireworks and sparklers and tests revealed that the mix was combustible, but not explosive. The state youth welfare office took charge of the boy.

Suspect
The suspect was born in Ludwigshafen.  His name was not released because of German privacy laws; German law also does not allow criminal prosecution of those younger than 14.  The suspect had contemplated traveling to Syria in mid-2016 to join the Islamic State.

Investigation and trial
On 13 April 2018, an Islamic State supporter was sentenced in Vienna to nine years in prison for instigating the crime and for planning another attack on the US airbase in Ramstein, Germany along with a 15-year-old girl married to him under Islamic law. During the trial, the suspect of the Ludwigshafen bombing, now 14 years old, emphasized that the bombing was his own idea. The bombing only failed because the fuse cord was insufficient.

Reactions
 Steffen Seibert, a spokesman for the German government, said: "This is certainly a report that scares everyone."
 Peter Altmaier, The German minister of the chancellery, said that the authorities were "sensitized". They had to investigate whether the child was radicalised at home or through the internet.

See also
 2016 Düsseldorf terrorism plot
 2016 Chemnitz terrorism plot

References

21st century in Rhineland-Palatinate
Crime in Rhineland-Palatinate
December 2016 crimes in Europe
December 2016 events in Germany
Failed terrorist attempts in Germany
2016 attempted bombings
ISIL terrorist incidents in Germany
Islamist attack plots and attacks on Christmas markets
November 2016 crimes in Europe
November 2016 events in Germany
Terrorist incidents in Germany in 2016
2016 attempted bombings